The following is a list of hospitals in Cameroon by region showing the type and location of the hospitals.

Large hospitals in Cameroon, such as the 650 bed-Central Hospital of Yaoundé founded in 1933, date from the French and British rule period.  The General Hospital in Yaoundé was originally established for blacks only.

Beginning in 2016, Cameroon's health infrastructure was organized into the 10 Regions containing 189 health districts, 1800 health areas managed by the Cameroonian Ministry of Public Health.  There are district hospitals in most districts and regional hospitals in all Regions except the East Region.  There were approximately 5166 public and private health facilities spread throughout the national territory. Access to health services in Cameroon in 2016 was at 2.19 health facilities per 10,000 inhabitants.  Besides public hospitals, there are also non-profit hospitals managed for the most part by religious organizations.  There are several hospitals in Cameroon built by or supported by the Chinese Ministry of Health. The health facilities are organized into seven main categories: general hospitals, central hospitals, regional hospitals, district hospitals, district medical centers, Integrated health centers and ambulatory health centers.

Adamawa 
The Ministry of Public Health has established nine health districts in the Adamawa Region.  There are five district hospitals, one private hospital, and one regional hospital in the Adamawa Region.

Centre 
The Ministry of Public Health has established 30 health districts in the Centre Region.  There are 27 district hospitals, one Central Hospital and University (CHU), and one regional hospital in the Centre Region.  The Central Hospital of Yaoundé, founded in 1933, is the largest hospital in Cameroon with 650 beds.

East 
The Ministry of Public Health has established 14 health districts in the East Region.  There are 14 district hospitals in the East Region.

Littoral
The Ministry of Public Health has established 24 health districts in the Littoral Region.  There are 18 district hospitals in the Littoral Region.

North 
The Ministry of Health has divided the North Region into 15 health districts.  There are two health districts for Garoua. The regional hospital is in Garoua.  In addition to the district hospitals listed below, there is a Golombe health district.

Extreme North
The Ministry of Public Health has divided the Extreme North Region into 30 health districts.

Northwest 
The Ministry of Public Health has divided the Northwest Region into 19 health districts.

South 
There are 10 Ministry of Public Health districts in the South Region.

Southwest 
There are 14 Ministry of Public Health districts in the Southwest Region.

West 
There are 20 Ministry of Public Health districts in the West Region.

Gallery

Notes

References

 

Hospitals
Cameroon

Cameroon